Eastcliff is a suburb of Johannesburg, South Africa. It is located in Region F.

Johannesburg Region F